Mia Blazhevska Eminova (born August 4, 2005) is a Macedonian swimmer who competed at the 2020 Summer Olympics in the women's 100 meter freestyle event where she finished 40th with a time of 57.19 seconds. She also competed in the 2020 European Championships in the 50 meter freestyle, 100 meter freestyle, 50 meter backstroke, and 100 meter backstroke.

References 

Living people
2005 births
Macedonian female swimmers
Olympic swimmers of North Macedonia
Swimmers at the 2020 Summer Olympics